The Wakenitz is a river in southeastern Schleswig-Holstein and at the border to Mecklenburg-Vorpommern.

The Wakenitz's source is the Ratzeburger See in Ratzeburg. The majority of its eastern bank forms the border between Schleswig-Holstein and Mecklenburg-Vorpommern. After the end of World War II this river formed part of the Iron Curtain between the Federal Republic of Germany and the German Democratic Republic.

See also 

List of rivers of Schleswig-Holstein
List of rivers of Mecklenburg-Vorpommern

Rivers of Schleswig-Holstein
Lübeck
Rivers of Mecklenburg-Western Pomerania
Rivers of Germany